The Canby Commercial Historic District is a designation applied to the historic downtown of Canby, Minnesota, United States.  It comprises 24 contributing properties built from 1892 to the 1930s.  It was listed as a historic district on the National Register of Historic Places in 1980 for having local significance in the theme of commerce.  It was nominated for being a well-preserved example of western Minnesota's commercial districts rebuilt after disastrous fires, and a longstanding regional trade center.

See also
 National Register of Historic Places listings in Yellow Medicine County, Minnesota

References

Buildings and structures in Yellow Medicine County, Minnesota
Commercial buildings on the National Register of Historic Places in Minnesota
Historic districts on the National Register of Historic Places in Minnesota
National Register of Historic Places in Yellow Medicine County, Minnesota